Monument Hill may refer to:

 Monument Hill (Colorado), a mountain pass in Colorado, in the United States
 Monument Hill (Washington), a hill in Eastern Washington, in the United States
 Monument Hill and Kreische Brewery State Historic Sites, a state park in Texas, in the United States
Monument Hill, a site at Organ Pipe Cactus National Monument, Arizona
Monument Hill, a lookout and picnic spot near Kaikohe, New Zealand.

See also
Monument Hills, California